Rivest is a surname.  Notable people with the surname include:
Chris Rivest, American entrepreneur
Jean-Claude Rivest (born 1943), Canadian lawyer and politician
Jesse Rivest (born 1977), Canadian singer-songwriter
Patrick Rivest-Bunster (born 1986), Canadian recurve archer
Ron Rivest (born 1947), American cryptographer and professor